Alka Amin is an Indian film, television, and theatre actress. She graduated from the National School of Drama. She is known for her performance in Bollywood movies like Dum Laga Ke Haisha, Shaadi Mein Zaroor Aana, Luka Chuppi, Kedarnath, Romeo Akbar Walter, Badhaai Ho, Amazon exclusive web series Chacha Vidhayak Hain Humare, award-winning short film Maya and Sex Chat With Pappu and Papa. Her notable performances include playing 'Veena Chopra' in Parichay.

Filmography

Television

Films

Web series

References

External links
 

20th-century Indian actresses
21st-century Indian actresses
Living people
Indian television actresses
Year of birth missing (living people)